Ai Keita is the name of:
Fuudo, Japanese egame player, real name Keita Ai
Aï Keïta, Burkinabe actress